Khronos may refer to:
Khronos (Maktub album)
Khronos (Rotting Christ album)
Khronos (game), a board game
Khronos Group, an open standards consortium
Chronos, the personification of time in Greek mythology.

See also 
Chronos (disambiguation)
Kronos (disambiguation)